The 2014–15 South Dakota Coyotes men's basketball team represented the University of South Dakota during the 2014–15 NCAA Division I men's basketball season. The Coyotes, led by first year head coach Craig Smith, played their home games at the DakotaDome and were members of The Summit League. They finished the season 17–16, 9–7 in The Summit League play to finish in a tie for fourth place. They advanced to the quarterfinals of The Summit League tournament where they lost to South Dakota State.

Roster

Schedule

|-
!colspan=9 style="background:#E34234; color:#FFFFFF;"| Regular season

|-
!colspan=9 style="background:#E34234; color:#FFFFFF;"| The Summit League tournament

References

South Dakota Coyotes men's basketball seasons
South Dakota
Coyo
Coyo